Cryptoblabes ferrealis is a species of snout moth in the genus Cryptoblabes. It was described by Oswald Bertram Lower in 1902, and is known from Australia.

References

Moths described in 1902
Cryptoblabini